Kyle Peak is a peak  northeast of Mount McCarthy, rising to about  in the Barker Range of the Victory Mountains, Victoria Land, Antarctica. It was named by the New Zealand Antarctic Place-Names Committee after geologist Philip R. Kyle, who worked in the vicinity of this peak, including in The Pleiades, with the Victoria University of Wellington Antarctic Expedition, 1971–72, and did further geological work in this area with the United States Antarctic Research Program during the International Northern Victoria Land Project, 1981–82.

References

Mountains of Victoria Land
Borchgrevink Coast